Riverside, is a neighborhood in South Memphis. The neighborhood includes Kansas Street, Carver High (which is on Pennsylvania Street) and Martin Luther King Riverside Park.

Boundaries
The main boundary of Riverside is South Parkway, which is on the north.

Notables 
 Harold Ford Jr., US congressman from 1997 to 2007
 Eric Jerome Dickey, author

References
DeCosta-Willis, Miriam (2008). Notable Black Memphians

Neighborhoods in Memphis, Tennessee